Badathala Adisekhar (born 14 April 1964) is an Indian weightlifter. He competed in the 1992 and 1996 Summer Olympics.

References

1964 births
Living people
Weightlifters at the 1992 Summer Olympics
Weightlifters at the 1996 Summer Olympics
Indian male weightlifters
Olympic weightlifters of India
Commonwealth Games medallists in weightlifting
Commonwealth Games gold medallists for India
Commonwealth Games silver medallists for India
Weightlifters at the 1994 Commonwealth Games
20th-century Indian people
21st-century Indian people
Medallists at the 1994 Commonwealth Games